Sam Shaw may refer to:

Sports
 Sam Shaw (baseball) (1863–1947), American professional baseball player
 Sam Shaw (wrestler) (born 1984), American professional wrestler 
 Sam Shaw (footballer) (born 1991), Australian rules footballer
 Sam Shaw (cyclist), (born 1992), New Zealand cyclist, represented New Zealand at the 2010 Summer Youth Olympics

Others 
  (1912–1999), American photographer and film producer (e.g. Paris Blues)
 Sam Shaw (sound engineer) (born 1946), American sound engineer, won BAFTA Award for Best Sound
 Sam Shaw (politician) (born 1957), American politician

See also
 Samuel Shaw (disambiguation)
 Samantha Shaw (disambiguation)
 Sam Shore (disambiguation)